Marcus' Children is a studio album by Jamaican reggae singer Burning Spear originally released in 1978 as Social Living.

"Marcus Say Jah No Dead" was covered by Sinéad O'Connor on her album Throw Down Your Arms (2005).

The LP appears in a scene in the 1994 film Léon: The Professional, where it is endorsed by one of the movie's antagonists.

Track listing

Marcus' Children AKA Social Living
"Marcus Children Suffer" - 4:39
"Social Living"- 2:49
"Nyah Keith" - 4:03
"Institution" - 3:29
"Marcus Senior" - 5:09
"Civilized Reggae" - 7:11
"Mister Garvey" - 4:52
"Come"- 3:53
"Marcus Say Jah No Dead" - 3:57

Social Living (2003 Island Remaster)
"Marcus Children Suffer"
"Social Living"
"Nayah Keith"
"Institution"
"Marcus Senior"
"Civilized Reggae"
"Mister Garvey"
"Come"
"Marcus Say Jah No Dead"

Bonus Tracks
"Social Living [Extended Mix]"
"Civilized Reggae [Extended Mix]"

Credits
Recorded at Harry J Studio, Kingston, Jamaica and at Compass Point Studios, Nassau, Bahamas
Engineer Sylvan Morris
Mixed at Compass Point Studios by Karl Pitterson and Benji Armbrister
All songs written by Winston Rodney and published by EMI Copyright Holdings Ltd. except tracks 2, 3, 5 published by Blue Mountain Music

Musicians
Earl "Chinna" Smith - guitar
Bertram "Ranchie" McLean - guitar
Brinsley Forde - guitar
Donald "Roots" Kinsey - guitar
Donald Griffiths - guitar
Lowell "Sly" Dunbar - drums
Leroy "Horsemouth" Wallace - drums
Angus Gaye - drums
Robbie Shakespeare - bass
Aston "Family Man" Barrett - bass
George Oban - bass
Bernard "Touter" Harvey - keyboards
Earl "Wire" Lindo - keyboards
Michael "Ibo" Cooper - keyboards
Courtney Hemmings - keyboards
Bobby Ellis - trumpet
Dick Cuthell - trumpet
Richard "Dirty Harry" Hall - tenor saxophone
Herman Marquis - alto saxophone
Vincent "Trommie" Gordon - trombone
Rico Rodriguez - trombone
Winston Rodney - percussion
Uziah "Sticky" Thompson - percussion

Blood and Fire release notes
Remastered by Kevin Metcalfe at the Town House, London
Designed and built by Mat at intro, London
Photograph of Cover by Phil Hale
Photograph of the Black Disciple Band by Kim Gottlieb
Photograph of Burning Spear by Adrian Boot
The copyright to recording is owned by Island Records Inc. and is licensed to Blood and Fire Ltd.
Blood and Fire would like to thank Chris Blackwell, Suzette Newman, Trevor Wyatt, Ian Moss and all at Island Records for their kind cooperation. Thanks also to Norman Urquia.

Burning Spear albums
1978 albums
Island Records albums